Skills for Life was the national strategy in England for improving adult literacy, language (ESOL) and numeracy skills and was established as part of the wider national Skills Strategy to increase the numbers of young people and adults with adequate skills. The strategy was launched by the Prime Minister, Tony Blair, in March 2001.

The Skills for Life strategy set out how the Government aimed to reach its Public Service Agreement (PSA) target to improve "the basic skill levels of 2.25 million adults between the launch of Skills for Life in 2001 and 2010, with a milestone of 1.5 million in 2007". This PSA target was part of the wider objective to "tackle the adult skills gaps", by increasing the number of adults with the skills required for employability and progression to higher levels of training. The rationale behind the Skills for Life strategy was thus, firstly, to lift basic skills in the face of the changing nature of the workplace and the increased complexity of traditional jobs and secondly, to make Britain a more equal society and ‘close the gap’ by addressing issues that include area and neighbourhood deprivation, and educational attainment.

The Leitch Review, (Prosperity for all in the global economy - world class skills, Dec 2006) commissioned by the Government, indicated the next likely Skills for Life target. The Review recommended that the UK should commit to becoming a world leader in skills by 2020 with a basic skills objective "for 95% of adults to achieve the basic skills of functional literacy and numeracy" by 2020 (a total of 7.4 million adult attainments over the period).

Background 

In 1998 the Government asked Sir Claus Moser, Chairman of the Basic Skills Agency, to produce a report on how to "tackle the vast basic skills problem in this country". The Moser Report (A Fresh Start – improving literacy and numeracy) was published in 1999. Drawing on the findings of the 1996 OECD survey of adult literacy/numeracy skills (IALS: International Adult Literacy Survey), the Moser Report made comparisons with other European countries, notably Sweden, and claimed that 20% of adults in Britain lacked functional basic skills, linking these low levels of literacy (and numeracy) with low earnings, poor job opportunities, high unemployment, poor housing poor health, depression and imprisonment. However, it should be acknowledged that the measurement of literacy underpinning understandings of literacy 'levels' in adult populations is contested, not only by literacy scholars in the UK but also in other countries in the OECD, eg, Canada, Australia, France where similar surveys of adult literacy skills were conducted.

The Government responded by launching the Skills for Life strategy. When the strategy was launched in 2001, free literacy, language and numeracy training was made available to all adults without a Level 2 qualification (equivalent to a GCSE at A* - C). Initially, three curriculum areas were introduced: Literacy, Numeracy and English for Speakers of Other Languages (ESOL).

Scale of the problem 

As part of the Skills for Life strategy, a nationwide survey of basic skills (Skills for Life Needs and Impact Survey) was published in 2003. Evidence again was largely taken from the OECD survey, IALS (International Adult Literacy Survey). While many literacy scholars eg, those attached to the Literacy Research Centre at Lancaster University, were cautious of the figures, the survey showed that of the adult population aged 16–65 in England:
5.2 million (16%) have literacy skills below Level 1 (equivalent to a GCSE at D – G)
15 million (46%) have numeracy skills below Level 1 (equivalent to a GCSE at D – G)
Only 18% achieved Level 2 in both literacy and numeracy (equivalent to a GCSE at A* - C).

Estimates placed the cost to the country of poor basic skills at £10 billion a year. This took account of the effect of lower incomes, reduced productivity, poorer health and the cost of benefits and welfare services. The cost of poor numeracy and literacy skills for a company employing 1,000 people was estimated at £626,000 per year. For organisations employing 51-100 employees the cost was estimated to be nearer £108,000.

Higher earnings are correlated to good basic skills (Skills for Life Needs and Impact Survey) On average:
Those with Level 2 numeracy skills earned an additional £4,000 per year
Those with Level 2 literacy skills an extra £2,000.

Further analysis of non-graduates published in 2006, showed that three years after finishing a numeracy course, people were earning on average 13% more than those who had not been on such a course. Attending a literacy course generally has less impact on earnings.

Qualifications 

The Qualifications and Curriculum Authority (QCA) and the Department for Children, Schools and Families published the first national standards for adult literacy and numeracy in 2000. These standards formed the basis of the core curricula and national qualifications in literacy and numeracy at Entry Level, Level 1, and Level 2.

The following qualifications, achieved by adult learners, aged 16 years and older, count towards the Skills for Life target:
Adult literacy and numeracy certificates (based on the 2000 national standards)
Key Skills qualifications in 'Communication' and 'Application of Number'
GCSE Maths and English

Objectives 

The Skills for Life strategy had one over-riding target (A) and four key delivery objectives (B-E):

A. PSA target: to improve the basic skills levels of 2.25 million adults between the launch of Skills for Life in 2001 and 2010, with an interim target of 1.5 million adults by 2007

B. Learner and employer engagement: to engage and increase participation of young people and adults from priority groups in literacy, language and numeracy learning

C. Ensuring capacity: to improve the planning and funding of literacy, language and numeracy provision so that learning provision is effective and well co-ordinated

D. Improving quality: to improve standards and quality in teaching and learning in literacy, language and numeracy and to remodel and professionalise the Skills for Life workforce.

E. Improving achievement and progression: to improve outcomes in literacy, language and numeracy provision and progression onto further learning and to assess the impact on social inclusion and economic outcomes.

Target groups
 Unemployed people and benefit claimants
 Jobseekers
 Prisoners and those supervised in the community
 Public sector employees
 Low-skilled people in employment
 Young adults
 Other groups at risk of exclusion
 Parents
 People who live in disadvantaged communities

Gremlins 

A national "Get On" media campaign with a national helpline encouraged adults to overcome their fears of learning and "get rid of their gremlins". The campaign was part of a tradition of recruiting adults via broadcasting media, pioneered by the BBC in the early 1970s.

Progress 

Between the launch of the strategy in 2001 and 2008, 5.7 million adults took up 12 million Skills for Life learning opportunities with 2,276,000 learners achieving their first Skills for Life qualification in literacy, language or numeracy. (Figures are for June 2008.) This means the 2010 target for 2.25m achievements was met two years early.

Key organisations involved in the Skills for Life strategy 

The Skills for Life Strategy Unit, based in the Department for Children, Schools and Families, was responsible overall for driving forward the Skills for Life strategy and ensuring efforts to improve basic skills are well co-ordinated. The Unit's priorities included:
 Improving the standards in and quality of teaching and learning
 Ensuring that provision is effectively planned and funded
 Managing the transition of responsibility for the delivery of work to partner organisations and the ongoing risks that this could pose to delivery
 Ensuring that provision is accessible to those from priority groups
 Engaging employers and continuing the development of high quality workplace learning
 Promoting the take up of numeracy qualifications and learning
 Improving the analysis of performance to highlight our fundamental role in the long term
skills agenda being considered as part of the Leitch Review.

The Learning and Skills Council (LSC) was the chief delivery partner, which through its network of 9 regional and 47 local councils was responsible for the planning and funding of post-16 vocational education and training. The LSC led responsibility for delivering the adult skills PSA target. The LSC had responsibility for offender learning, and Jobcentre Plus clients.

The Learning and Skills Improvement Service (LSIS) was created by the Government as a component of the Learning and Skills Success for All programme, and following a merger between the Quality Improvement Agency and the Centre for Excellence in Leadership. The service aimed to guide improvements in the Further Education (FE) sector.

Skills for Life was inspected against the common inspection framework by the Inspectorates: the Adult Learning Inspectorate (ALI) and OfSTED.

The Qualification and Curriculum Authority (QCA) led on developing new qualifications and the associated standards and assessment models. It worked with Awarding Bodies to ensure new qualifications were embedded.

CfBT Education Trust was a major contributor to the Government's Skills for Life strategy to raise the quality of teaching and learning in adult literacy, numeracy and language (ESOL) provision since 2001.  CfBT developed Skills for Life materials for Embedded Learning, supported Key Skills Support, and Subject Learning Coaches programmes, managed the Supporting Dyslexic Learners in Different Contexts programme, and managed the Skills for Life Quality Initiative programme on behalf of LSC.  It went on to lead on the Skills for Life Improvement Programme on behalf of LSIS, ran the Sussex Skills for Life Development Centre, and conducted regular research on aspects of Skills for Life.

A National Research and Development Centre for Adult Literacy and Numeracy (NRDC) was set up as a centre dedicated to conducting research into adult literacy, numeracy, ESOL and ICT. It was established and funded by the DfES and was a partnership between the Institute of Education in London, The Lancaster University Literacy Research Centre, and Sheffield University.

Key initiatives and resources 

A number of initiatives were developed to support the Skills for Life strategy and its "whole organization" approach. When the coalition government came to power in 2010, many of these initiatives came to an end or their functions were transferred to other agencies.

The Excellence Gateway included a new Skills for Life area which rationalised and brought together legacy Skills for Life websites and existing LSIS Skills for Life programme websites. These websites included the Tools Library, Embedded Learning Portal and Supporting Dyslexic Learners. The area enabled the resources across all the previous websites to be organised and presented in ways which meet the needs of sector staff.

A revised Skills for Life core curriculum was developed by LSIS in the form of an interactive online tool that:
 Promoted flexible and creative use of the curriculum content in a variety of learning contexts, including embedded learning;
 Enhanced content and resources with additional guidance, exemplification and vocational material;
 Provided tools and features that will enable practitioners, including the wider embedded-learning audience, to create effective personal learning experiences; and
 Provided an online community where ideas and innovation can be shared and developed.

Train to Gain offered skills advice and business needs with training providers. The service, led by the LSC, was designed to enable adults to achieve a first full Level 2 qualification and to improve their basic literacy and numeracy skills.

The Skills for Life Improvement Programme built on previous initiatives making best use of people, systems and resources to deliver the Skills for Life Strategy. The Improvement Programme, delivered on behalf of LSIS by CfBT Education Trust and partners, was designed to support creative change in a wide range of self-improving organisations operating in a variety of different settings.

Move On Up was a national project funded by the Department for Children, Schools and Families and delivered by Skills for Life company, Tribal. The project aims to help adults to brush up their skills and gain the National Certificate in Adult Literacy or Numeracy.

BBC Skillswise was an interactive adult literacy and numeracy resource from the BBC for tutors and learners, with a range of factsheets, worksheets and quizzes.

BBC raw was an interactive resource for adult learners wanting to improve skills for everyday life covering literacy, numeracy, financial capabilities and ICT. The site included a range of familiar faces such as Dominic Little, Phil Tufnell and Lenny Henry and resources including videos, comedy clips, activities, worksheets and true life stories.

The Whole Organisation Approach for Delivering Skills for Life Project was designed to embed Skills for Life across post compulsory education. Delivered by KPMG, Tribal, LSN and The Experience Corps on behalf of LSIS.

Footnotes

External links 
Skills for Life Strategy Unit
BBC Adult Learning Portal with websites including Skillswise

Alternative education
Organizations promoting literacy